Twickets is a ticket resale company based in the United Kingdom.

Billed as a "more ethical ticketing company", it only permits tickets to be resold at or below the designated face value plus booking and delivery fees.

The site has been endorsed by various artists and promoters including Ed Sheeran, Andrew Lloyd-Webber, and Sam Fender, and is the official resale marketplace for these and other artists including the Spice Girls and George Ezra.

Competitors
AXS Marketplace
FanSale

References

External links
 

Marketing companies of the United Kingdom
Ticket sales companies